Applewood Farm is a farmstead in Ledyard, Connecticut, United States. Constructed in 1826 by Russel Gallup, the farmhouse was built with a colonial center chimney design with Federal style details that has been modernized to the early 20th century without significantly changing the floor plan. Named after the apple orchards planted by Russel Gallup, Applewood Farm developed significantly under the ownership of Everett Gallup, the last member of the family to own the property. The property was later owned by Arlene Meyer Cohen and a 40-acre parcel was sold off in November 1984. After the Betz family became the owners it was added to the National Register of Historic Places and operated as a bed and breakfast through the 1990s. In 1987, the property included five contributory structures, the farmhouse, corn crib, barn, silo and chicken coop. The property also has one non-contributing structure, a machinery shed from the 1960s.

History 
The farmhouse was built by Russel Gallup in 1826 before the incorporation of the town of Ledyard in 1836. Gallup served as a member of the Connecticut Militia in the War of 1812. He would hold the office of deacon for the Ledyard Congregation Church for over fifty years. The property was split as a deed to his second son, Rufus Gallup in 1855 and ownership passed upon Russel Gallup's death in 1869. Rufus Gallup took the same approach with his son, Russell Gallup II, and split the property in 1877. Russell Gallup II was a teacher and became a Judge of Probate from 1896 until his death in 1911. Everett Gallup took over the farm in the 1920s and was the last member of the Gallup family to own the farm. The property was later owned by Arlene Meyer Cohen. A 40-acre parcel of the original property was sold to Sarter in November 1984. The house was acquired by the Betz family, who sought to operate the farmhouse as a bed and breakfast. Betz owned the farmhouse at the time of its nomination to the National Historic Register in 1987. Applewood Farm operated as "Applewood Farms Inn", serving as a six-guest room bed and breakfast through the 1990s. In 2005, the property was sold from Applewoods Estates LLC

Construction 
Built around 1826 by Russel Gallup, the two-and-a-half-story Applewood Farm's farmhouse design harkens back to the earlier colonial center chimney design with Federal style details.
 The National Register of Historic Places nomination form states that the house's construction may have been influenced by an earlier house built on the opposite side of Colonel Ledyard Highway, but there is no evidence for that design, but notes that it was a retardetaire example. The house and its additions are all topped with gable roofs and were using wooden shingles at the time of its historic nomination in 1987. The farmhouse has six fireplaces, with those on the first floor are made of cut granite blocks also with granite hearthstones and the second floor are made of brick with granite lintels with brick hearths. The house has had modernization throughout the years, including modernizing the kitchen and bathrooms that has not significantly altered the floor plan. The hardware in the house was modernized and updated over the years, but had reproduction colonial hardware and early 20th-century hardware at the time of its nomination. Some changes, like the installation of a new door in 1986 were done specifically to meet fire code regulations.

The rafters were made with a single planed side and the "rest is left round". A machinery shed dating to the 1960s was specifically listed a non-contributory asset. In 1987, the listed property had  out of the original  farm.

Importance 
Applewood Farm has served as a farm for over a century, with an 1850 census reporting it produced butter, cheese, rye, Indian corn, oats, wool, Irish potatoes and hay. Three apple orchards planted by Russell Gallup would become an important part of Applewood Farms and owe its name to those orchards. After Everett Gallup took over the farm in the 1920s, the farm produced fresh fruits and vegetables and poultry, eggs and dairy products. In 1994, the Applewood Farm reported having 700 trees tapped for maple syrup production and showed visitors the process of producing the syrup. Applewood Farms was added to the National Register of Historic Places in 1987 under criteria A for the Gallup family history that played an important role in the local history and under criteria C as an architecturally important example of a late colonial center chimney house.

See also
National Register of Historic Places listings in New London County, Connecticut

References

Houses on the National Register of Historic Places in Connecticut
Houses completed in 1826
Houses in Ledyard, Connecticut
Bed and breakfasts in Connecticut
National Register of Historic Places in New London County, Connecticut
1826 establishments in Connecticut
Farms on the National Register of Historic Places in Connecticut